Alps is an unincorporated community located in Meriwether County, Georgia, United States.

A post office called Alps was established in 1890, and remained in operation until 1910. The community was located inland away from the railroads.

References

Unincorporated communities in Meriwether County, Georgia
Unincorporated communities in Georgia (U.S. state)